Charles H. Taylor may refer to:
 Charles Taylor (North Carolina politician) (born 1941), US congressman from North Carolina
 Charles H. Taylor (Michigan politician) (1813–1889), American politician who served as the Michigan Secretary of State
 Charles H. Taylor (lyricist) (1859–1907), British lyricist
 Charles H. Taylor (publisher) (1846–1921), American journalist and member of the Massachusetts House of Representatives
 Chuck Taylor (salesman) (1901–1969), American basketball player and businessman

See also
 Charles Taylor (disambiguation)